Yi Ryang, also known as Lee Lyang (Hangul:이량, Hanja:李梁) (17 November 1519 – 8 March 1583), was a powerful politician during the Joseon Dynasty. His courtesy name was Gonggeo (공거, 公擧).

Life 
Yi Ryang was a member of the ruling Jeonju Yi clan, as a descendent of Grand Prince Hyoryeong. His older sister, Lady Yi, was the wife of Sim Kang. Their daughter, Lady Sim, married Grand Prince Gyungwon, a son of King Jungjong, who later became Myeongjong of Joseon.

In his early years, Yi Ryang studied at Chung Sa-ryong's private academies.

In 1546, he passed to Saengwon and Chinsa exams and in 1552, he passed the Imperial examination. Yi Ryang worked in the Inspection Department.

In 1550, there was tension with Yun Won-hyeong's group of supporters, who were trying to take more government power at the time, and Yi Ryang was promoted rapidly under the auspices of King Myeongjong. He was promoted to second level bureaucrat after only two years.

In 1563, it was discovered that Yi Ryang had illegally accumulated wealth. As a result, he was ousted from the government, but his punishment was lessened due to Yun Won-hyeong's intervention.

Yi Ryang died in exile on March 8, 1583.

Family 
 Father
 Yi Dae, Prince Jeonseong (전성군 이대, 全城君 李薱) (21 July 1488 - 29 October 1543)
 Mother
 Lady Jeong of the Dongnae Jeong clan (동래 정씨) (? - 9 January 1557)
 Wives and their issue(s): 
 Lady Yun of the Haman Yun clan (함안 윤씨)
 Son: Yi Jeong-bin (이정빈, 李廷賓) (8 August 1539 - 7 September 1592)
 Daughter-in-law: Lady Han of the Cheongju Han clan (청주 한씨) (? - 9 November 1592)
 Daughter: Lady Yi of the Jeonju Yi clan (전주 이씨)
 Son-in-law: Kim Bong-seo (김봉서, 金鳳瑞) of the Gwangsan Kim clan 
 Son: Yi Se-bin (이세빈, 李世賓); died prematurely 
 Son: Yi Yeon-bin (이언빈, 李彦賓)
 Son: Yi Han-bin (이한빈, 李漢賓)
 Lady Yun of the Papyeong Yun clan (파평 윤씨); daughter of Yun Ji-yang (윤지양, 尹之讓) — No issue.
 Unnamed concubine
 Unnamed son

Books 
 Yongsailgi (龍蛇日記, 용사일기)
 Munsuji (文殊志, 문수지)
 Saseonggangmok (四姓綱目, 사성강목)

Notes

External links 
 Lee Lyang 
 Lee Lyang 
 Lee Lyang 

1519 births
1583 deaths
Korean politicians
16th-century Korean philosophers
Jeonju Yi clan